All Saints' Church located inside the Kohati Gate of the old walled city of Peshawar in Khyber Pakhtunkhwa, Pakistan, is a parish of the Church of Pakistan. It is an architecturally unique place of Christian worship that bears a striking resemblance to a saracenic mosque with minarets and a dome.

History
The Church was opened on St. John's Day, 27 December 1883. Although original memorials in the church record early European benefactors and the names of mission staff, from the outset the church was described as a native Christian church built for the indigenous population of Peshawar. The first pastor of the church was the Rev. Imam Shah.

The foundation stone of the church was laid by Captain Graves whose widow presented the brass desk on the Lord's Table. A local architect, under the supervision of Church Missionary Society staff including the Rev. Thomas Hughes, was responsible for the design of the building. The building is cruciform in layout with the chancel at the west end. A plaque records: "This church is erected to the Glory of God and dedicated to the memory of All Saints in the year of our Lord Jesus Christ 1883."

Attack by terrorists

On September 22, 2013, two suicide bombers carried out an attack outside the church at the end of a Sunday service, killing 127 people and injuring 170. 600 parishioners were on the front lawn of the church, having lunch, when two bombers detonated themselves, leaving the church scattered with body parts. Victims included an estimated 37 children. TTP Jundullah, linked to the Taliban, said it had carried out the attack on the Christian congregation, saying, "We will continue our attacks on non-Muslims on Pakistani land."

This was the second attack on churches in the province of Khyber Pakhtunkhwa in a year, where another church in Mardan was burnt exactly a year before this incident.

On January 30, 2022 two clergymen from the church were shot dead by attackers approaching on a motorcycle as they went from the church to the clergy house attached to the church.  Pastor William Siraj was killed instantly and Revd. Patrick Naeem was injured and died later of his wounds. On the occasion of the killings Azad Marshall, senior Bishop of the Church of Pakistan condemned the attack and said "We demand justice and the protection of Christians by the government of Pakistan."

References

Further reading
 Jan, A. 'Mosque-like', brief, cursory article, in the Footloose section, The News on Sunday, April 15, 2008.
 Hughes, TP. All Saints' Memorial Church, n.p, 1855.

External links
 All Saints' Church Peshawar by Thomas Patrick Hughes

Churches in Peshawar
Church of Pakistan church buildings in Pakistan
Churches completed in 1883
1883 establishments in British India